"Control Myself" is a song by American rapper LL Cool J from his 12th album, Todd Smith (2006). The song was written by Jermaine Dupri, James Phillips, Ryan Toby, John Miller, Afrika Bambaataa, Arthur Baker and John Robie. The song was produced by Dupri, with co-production by LRoc, and features guest vocals from American entertainer Jennifer Lopez. "Control Myself" contains a sample of Bambaataa and Soulsonic Force's 1983 song "Looking for the Perfect Beat", while the vocals interpolate Grandmaster Flash and Melle Mel's 1983 song "White Lines (Don't Don't Do It)" and Bambaataa and Soulsonic Force's 1982 song "Planet Rock".

Release
"Control Myself" was released as the album's lead single in February 2006 and remained on the U.S. Billboard Hot 100 chart for eleven weeks, peaking at number four. After being released as a digital download in April 2006, the song debuted at number two on the Billboard Hot Digital Songs chart and made a strong Hot 100 re-entry at number four. This broke a record previously held by Jay-Z's 1998 song "Hard Knock Life (Ghetto Anthem)", which had re-entered the chart in March 1999 at number 20. The song also peaked at number two in the United Kingdom, where Smith and Lopez's previous collaboration, "All I Have", had achieved the same feat in March 2003.

Music video
The music video was directed by Hype Williams and was filmed at Sony Studios in New York City on January 2, 2006. It debuted in the U.S. on February 13, 2006 and in Europe on February 19, 2006. Like some of Williams' other videos, video footage is displayed where black bars would appear on a 4:3 TV for a widescreen production. The video peaked at number two on MTV's Total Request Live, number three on BET's 106 & Park, and number eighteen on VH1's VSpot Top 20 Countdown.

Track listings and formats
European CD single
 "Control Myself" – 3:56
 "Control Myself" (Jason Nevins Funktek Edit) – 4:02

European CD maxi single
 "Control Myself" – 3:56
 "Control Myself" (Jason Nevins Funktek Edit) – 4:02
 "Control Myself" (Instrumental) – 3:54
 "Control Myself" (Video)

US 12-inch single
A1. "Control Myself" (Radio) – 3:54
A2. "Control Myself" (Instrumental) – 3:54
B1. "Control Myself" (Radio) – 3:54
B2. "Control Myself" (Instrumental) – 3:54

UK 12-inch single
A1. "Control Myself" (Album Version) – 3:54
A2. "Control Myself" (Instrumental) – 3:54
B1. "Control Myself" (Jason Nevins Electrotex Club Mix) – 8:53

German 12-inch single
A. "Control Myself" (Explicit Version) – 3:58
B. "Control Myself" (Instrumental) – 3:54

Charts

Weekly charts

Year-end charts

Sales and certifications

Release history

References

External links
 

2006 songs
2006 singles
Def Jam Recordings singles
Jennifer Lopez songs
LL Cool J songs
Music videos directed by Hype Williams
Songs written by Jermaine Dupri
Songs written by John Robie
Songs written by LL Cool J
Songs written by LRoc
Songs written by Ryan Toby